The 10th Southeast Asia Basketball Association Championship was the qualifying tournament for the 2013 FIBA Asia Championship; it also served as a regional championship involving Southeast Asian basketball teams. It was held on June 20 to June 23, 2013 at Medan, Indonesia. The two best teams qualified for the 2013 FIBA Asia Championship.

Preliminary round

Final

Awards

Final standings

References 

2013
International basketball competitions hosted by Indonesia
2012–13 in Asian basketball
2012–13 in Thai basketball
2012–13 in Malaysian basketball
2012–13 in Indonesian basketball
2012–13 in Singaporean basketball